Cobbold is a surname. Notable people with the surname include:

 Cameron Cobbold, 1st Baron Cobbold (1904–1987), Governor of the Bank of England
 David Lytton-Cobbold, 2nd Baron Cobbold (born 1937), British peer
 Elizabeth Cobbold (1765–1824), British writer and poet
 Lady Evelyn Cobbold (1867–1963), Scottish noblewoman and convert to Islam
 Felix Cobbold (1841–1909), British barrister and Liberal Party politician
 Hermione Cobbold, Baroness Cobbold (1905–2004), wife of Cameron Cobbold
 Humphrey Cobbold (born 1964), British businessman
 John Cobbold (disambiguation), people who share that name
 Nevill Cobbold (1862–1922), footballer
 Ralph Cobbold (1869–1965), British soldier and writer
 Richard Cobbold (1797–1877), British writer
 Thomas Cobbold (disambiguation), people who share that name
 William Cobbold (composer) (1560–1639), English renaissance composer

See also
 Cobbold family tree, showing the relationship between many of the above
 Baron Cobbold
 Cobbold Commission
 Tolly Cobbold, brewing company